Little Men is an 1871 novel by Louisa May Alcott.

Little Men may also refer to:

 Little Men (1934 film), a 1934 film based on the novel
 Little Men (1940 film), a 1940 film based on the novel
 Little Men (1998 film), a 1998 film based on the novel
 Little Men (2016 film), a 2016 American film
 Little Men (TV series), a 1998 TV series based on the novel

See also
 Little Man (disambiguation)